The Diocese of Osimo e Cingoli was a Roman Catholic diocese in Italy.

It was founded in 1725 from a merger of the Diocese of Osimo and the Diocese of Cingoli.  In 1986 it merged with the Diocese of Macerata-Tolentino, the Diocese of Recanati and the Diocese of San Severino to form the Diocese of Macerata-Tolentino-Recanati-Cingoli-Treia.

It was contained within the Papal States.

Bishops

Diocese of Osimo
Latin Name: Auximana
Erected: 7th Century
Giambattista Sinibaldi, (1515–1547 Died)
Cipriano Senili, (1547–1551 Died)
Bernardino de Cupis (bishop), (1551–1574 Resigned)
Cornelio Firmano, (1574–1588 Died)
Teodosio Fiorenzi, (1588–1591 Died)
Antonio Maria Gallo, (1591–1620 Died)
Agostino Galamini, (1620–1639 Died)
Girolamo Verospi, (1642–1652 Died)
Lodovico Betti, (1652–1655 Died)
Antonio Bichi, (1656–1691 Died)
Opizio Pallavicini, (1691–1700 Died)
Michelangelo dei Conti, (1709–1712 Appointed, Archbishop (Personal Title) of Viterbo e Tuscania)
Orazio Filippo Spada, (1714–1724 Died)
Agostino Pipia, (1724–1726 Resigned)

Diocese of Osimo e Cingoli
United: 19 August 1725 with the Diocese of Cingoli
Immediately Subject to the Holy See

Pier Secondo Radicati de Cocconato, (1728–1729 Died)
Ferdinando Agostino Bernabei, (1729–1734 Died)
Giacomo Lanfredini, (1734–1740 Resigned)
Pompeo Compagnoni, (1740–1774 Died)
Guido Calcagnini, (1776–1807 Died)
Giovanni Castiglione (cardinal, 1714–1815), (1808–1815 Died)
Carlo Andrea Pelagallo, (1815–1822 Died)
Ercole Dandini, (1823–1824 Resigned)
Timoteo Maria Ascensi, (1827–1828 Died)
Giovanni Antonio Benvenuti, (1828–1838 Died)
Giovanni Soglia Ceroni, (1839–1856 Died)
Giovanni Brunelli, (1856–1861 Died)
Salvatore Nobili Vitelleschi, (1863–1871 Resigned)
Michele Seri-Molini, (1871–1888 Died)
Egidio Mauri, O.P., (1888–1893 Appointed, Archbishop of Ferrara)
Giovanni Battista Scotti, (1894–5 Dec 1916 Died)
Pacifico Fiorani, (1917–1924 Died)
Monalduzio Leopardi, (1926–1944 Died)
Domenico Brizi, (1945–1964 Died)

Diocese of Osimo
Latin Name: Auximana
25 January 1985: The former Diocese of Cingoli was split from the Diocese of Osimo e Cingoli and united with the Diocese of Macerata e Tolentino, the Diocese of Recanati, and the Diocese of San Severino (-Treia) to form the Diocese of Macerata-Tolentino-Recanati-Cingoli-Treia.
Carlo Maccari, (1972–1986 Appointed, Archbishop of Ancona-Osimo)

United: 30 September 1986 with the Diocese of Ancona to form the Roman Catholic Archdiocese of Ancona-Osimo

References

External links
 GCatholic.org

Former Roman Catholic dioceses in Italy
Religious organizations established in 1725
Dioceses established in the 18th century
1725 establishments in the Papal States
1725 establishments in Italy